Kozloyalovo (Quźlıyal) is a rural locality (a village) in Amzibashevsky Selsoviet, Kaltasinsky District, Bashkortostan, Russia. The population was 151 as of 2010. There are 3 streets.

Geography 
Chashkino is the nearest rural locality.

References 

Rural localities in Kaltasinsky District